David Pratt may refer to:
David Pratt (politician) (born 1955), Canadian politician
David Pratt (Canadian broadcaster), Canadian sports radio personality and columnist
David Pratt (cricketer) (born 1938), English cricketer
David Pratt (footballer) (1896–1967), Scottish football player and manager
David Foster Pratt (1918–2010), American artist, art instructor and designer
David Pratt (Scottish journalist)
David Pratt (South Africa) (1908–1961), failed assassin of South African Prime Minister Hendrik Verwoerd
David C. Pratt, American businessman
David Wixon Pratt, spectroscopist
David Pratt (author), American author